St. Mary's Dominican College was a liberal arts college for women in New Orleans, in the U.S. state of Louisiana.

History
The college was founded by the Dominican Sisters congregation of St. Mary as St. Mary's Academy. The high school section separated to become St. Mary's Dominican High School.

St. Mary's Dominican College was chartered in 1910 and operated until 1984, when it was disbanded.  Its grounds were sold to Loyola University, and became Loyola's Broadway campus.

Notable alumnae

 Helen Prejean, CSJ – Roman Catholic nun and leading American anti-death penalty activist

Notable faculty 
 Angela Gregory – sculptor and art professor, was sculptor-in-residence at the college for some time
 John Kennedy Toole – novelist, best known for A Confederacy of Dunces, briefly taught English at the school

Notes

External sources

 St. Mary's Dominican Sisters of New Orleans
 A photo of the former college's campus

Universities and colleges in New Orleans
Educational institutions established in 1910
Defunct private universities and colleges in Louisiana
Defunct Catholic universities and colleges in the United States
Educational institutions disestablished in 1984
1910 establishments in Louisiana
Dominican universities and colleges in the United States
Catholic universities and colleges in Louisiana
1984 disestablishments in Louisiana